Brad Lambert (born 19 December 2003) is a Finnish-Canadian ice hockey forward currently playing for the Seattle Thunderbirds in the Western Hockey League (WHL) as a prospect to the Winnipeg Jets of the National Hockey League (NHL). He was drafted 30th overall by the Jets in the 2022 NHL Entry Draft.

As the youngest player on Team Finland and one of the youngest players in the entire 2021 World Junior Ice Hockey Championships, Lambert won the Bronze Medal.

Playing career
Following his third season in the Finnish Liiga, Lambert was selected by the Winnipeg Jets in the first-round, 30th overall in the 2022 NHL Entry Draft. In remaining in North America, Lambert attended the Jets 2022 training camp and pre-season and prior to the  season, he was signed to a three-year, entry-level contract with the Jets on 13 October 2022. He was immediately re-assigned to join AHL affiliate, the Manitoba Moose.

Personal life
Lambert was born in Lahti, Finland to a Canadian father and a Finnish mother, and he is a dual citizen of both countries. His uncle Lane Lambert played in the NHL and is currently the head coach for the New York Islanders.

Career statistics

Regular season and playoffs

International

References

External links
 

2003 births
Living people
Canadian people of Finnish descent
Finnish ice hockey centres
Finnish people of Canadian descent
HIFK (ice hockey) players
JYP Jyväskylä players
Lahti Pelicans players
Manitoba Moose players
National Hockey League first-round draft picks
Seattle Thunderbirds players
Sportspeople from Lahti
Winnipeg Jets draft picks
Finnish expatriate ice hockey players in the United States
Canadian expatriate ice hockey players in the United States